Lakshmi is a 2006-2008 Indian Tamil-language soap opera that aired on Sun TV from 24 July 2006 to 24 November 2006 and 27 November 2006 to 13 June 2008 for 500 episodes.

The show starred Meena, Vijay Adhiraj, Lakshmi Gopalaswamy, Mohan Sharma, Chetan, Saakshi Siva and Devadarshini. It was produced by Home Media, director by Sundar. K. Vijayan and R. Balaji yadav.

Plot
The story of a Brahmin Intelligence girl  (Meena) who falls in love with a boy (Vijay Adhiraj) from the so-called lower caste.

Cast

Main cast

 Meena as Lakshmi 
 Vijay Adhiraj
 Lakshmi Gopalaswamy as Nethra

Additional cast

 Mohan Sharma
 Malaysia Vasudevan
 Chetan 
 Saakshi Siva 
 Akash as Santhosh
 Santhana Bharathi 
 Reena 
 Manokar as ACP Poobalan
 Shailaja 
 Nikita Aria / Ramya Shankar
 Vinayak as Madhu 
 K.S. Jeyalakshmi 
 Pollachi Babu 
 Fathima Babu
 Preethi Sanjeev
 Rani
 Akila
Kanya Bharathi
 Tinku
 Rajasekar
 Gowthami Vembunathan
 Amarasigamani
 Pasi Sathya
 Srilekha Rajendran
 Rajendran
 Archana Suresh
 Ravi Varma
 T.S.Ragavendhar
 Vizhuthugal Santhanam
 Joker Thulasi

Original soundtrack

Title song
It was written by P. Vijay. It was sung by Binni Krishnakumar.

Soundtrack

Airing history
The show started airing on Sun TV on 24 July 2006 and It aired on Monday through Friday 8:30PM IST. Later its timing changed Starting from Monday 27 November 2006, the show was shifted to 10:00PM IST time Slot. A new show named Anjali replaced this show at 8:30PM IST

International broadcast
  It aired in the Indian state of Andhra Pradesh on Gemini TV Dubbed in Telugu language as Muddha Mandaram.
  In Sri Lanka Tamil Channel on Shakthi TV.
  In Australia Tamil Channel on Tharisanam TV & Global Tamil Vision.

See also
 List of programs broadcast by Sun TV

References

External links
 Official Website 

Sun TV original programming
2006 Tamil-language television series debuts
Tamil-language television shows
2008 Tamil-language television series endings